Qelij Chi (also Romanized as Qelīj Chī; also known as Qelīch Chī) is a village in Owch Tappeh-ye Sharqi Rural District, in the Central District of Meyaneh County, East Azerbaijan Province, Iran. At the 2006 census, its population was 101, in 19 families.

References 

Populated places in Meyaneh County